Cirque Peak is a  mountain summit located on the crest of the Sierra Nevada mountain range in California. It is situated on the common border of Tulare County with Inyo County, as well as the shared boundary of Golden Trout Wilderness and John Muir Wilderness, on land managed by Inyo National Forest. Cirque Peak is the highest point of the Golden Trout Wilderness, and ranks as the 175th highest peak in California. The Pacific Crest Trail traverses the southwest slope of this mountain, providing an approach option. The mountain was apparently named in 1890 by Joseph Nisbet LeConte and companions who noted the remarkable cirque on the north aspect.

Climate
According to the Köppen climate classification system, Cirque Peak has an alpine climate. Most weather fronts originate in the Pacific Ocean, and travel east toward the Sierra Nevada mountains. As fronts approach, they are forced upward by the peaks, causing them to drop their moisture in the form of rain or snowfall onto the range (orographic lift). Precipitation runoff from this mountain drains west to the Kern River via Golden Trout Creek, and east to Owens Valley via Cottonwood Creek.

Gallery

See also

 List of mountain peaks of California

References

External links
 Weather forecast: Cirque Peak
 Cirque Peak: Mountain-Forecast.com

Mountains of Tulare County, California
Inyo National Forest
Mountains of Inyo County, California
Mountains of the John Muir Wilderness
North American 3000 m summits
Mountains of Northern California
Sierra Nevada (United States)